Glyptoscelis juniperi is a species of leaf beetle. It is found in California in the United States.

Subspecies
These two subspecies belong to the species Glyptoscelis juniperi:
 Glyptoscelis juniperi juniperi Blake, 1967 i c g
 Glyptoscelis juniperi zanthocoma Blake, 1967 i c g
Data sources: i = ITIS, c = Catalogue of Life, g = GBIF, b = Bugguide.net

References

Further reading

 

Eumolpinae
Articles created by Qbugbot
Taxa named by Doris Holmes Blake
Beetles described in 1967
Beetles of the United States